John Peyton Sr. (1749–1829) was an English-born fisherman and trapper in the Colony of Newfoundland.

He was born in Christchurch, Dorset and came to Newfoundland in 1770. He lived in Fogo, where he was employed in cod fishing, until around 1775. He later spent his summers at Exploits and then his winters at Lower Sandy Point on the Bay of Exploits. He fished for salmon and was involved in the fur trade; he also owned his own schooner. In 1788, Peyton married Ann Galton. His wife and children remained at Dorset in England until 1812. Both his wife and daughter died that year and Peyton subsequently brought his son John to Newfoundland to join him as a partner in business. In 1819, he took part in an expedition led by his son John Peyton Jr., which ended with the capture of a Beothuk woman named Demasduwit and the killing of her husband Nonosbawsut, who was attempting to negotiate her release. The last known living Beothuk, Shawnadithit, spent five years as a servant in the Peyton household. Peyton Jr. was tried for the killing of Nonosbawsut and was found not guilty by the jury, with the judge concluding that "... (there was) no malice on the part of Peyton's party to get possession of any of (the Indians) by such violence as would occasion bloodshed."

Peyton Sr. was accused of violence against the Beothuks in retaliation for the theft of supplies from his fishing stations; John Bland, the magistrate at Bonavista, recommended that he be expelled from the Bay of Exploits.

Peyton died in the Bay of Exploits in 1829.

His grandson, Thomas Peyton, later served in the Newfoundland assembly.

References 

1749 births
1829 deaths
Fur traders